Sir Ralph Ellis "Robin" Brook  (19 June 1908 – 25 October 1998) was a British merchant banker and a director of the Bank of England. He was knighted in the 1974 New Year Honours. His wife Helen Brook was founder of the Brook Advisory Centres.

As a fencer, he competed at the 1936 and 1948 Summer Olympics. In 1936, he won the sabre title at the British Fencing Championships.

The son of a surgeon, Brook was educated, through scholarships, at Eton College and subsequently at King's College, Cambridge, where he studied under Maynard Keynes, earning a double first in Economics.

References

External links
 

1908 births
1998 deaths
People educated at Eton College
Alumni of King's College, Cambridge
British male fencers
Knights Bachelor
Olympic fencers of Great Britain
Fencers at the 1936 Summer Olympics
Fencers at the 1948 Summer Olympics
Sportspeople from London